Arcadia High School may refer to:
Arcadia High School (Arizona)
Arcadia High School (California)
Arcadia High School (Louisiana)
Arcadia Charter School, a school in Northfield, Minnesota
Arcadia High School (Nebraska), in Arcadia, Nebraska
Arcadia High School (New York)
Arcadia High School (Ohio)
Arcadia High School (Virginia)
Arcadia High School (Wisconsin), in Arcadia, Wisconsin